James W. Griffin, Sr. (born February 13, 1935) was an American politician in the state of Iowa.

Griffin was born in Dow City, Iowa. He attended Omaha University and is an insurance executive. He served in the Iowa State Senate from 1969 to 1977 as a Republican.

References

1935 births
Living people
People from Crawford County, Iowa
University of Nebraska Omaha alumni
Businesspeople from Iowa
Republican Party Iowa state senators
American members of the Community of Christ